Doundoulakis is a surname. Notable people with the surname include: 

George Doundoulakis (1921–2007), Greek American physicist and soldier
Helias Doundoulakis (1923–2016), Greek American civil engineer